Howard Curtis (born 1949) is a British translator of French, Italian and Spanish fiction.

He won the 2013 Marsh Award for Children's Literature in Translation for his translation from Italian of In the Sea there are Crocodiles by Fabio Geda.

Translations

Translations from French
 Uncle Charles Has Locked Himself In by Georges Simenon. San Diego: Harcourt Brace Jovanovich, 1987.
 Memoirs from Elsinore by Franz Hellens. Translation of Mémoires d'Elseneur. New York: Peter Lang, 2000.
 The Officers' Ward, by Marc Dugain. Translated from Chambre des officiers. 2001.
 Submission: A Novel by Marthe Blau. Translated from Entre ses mains. London: Black Swan, 2004.
 Total Chaos by Jean-Claude Izzo. Translated from Total Khéops. New York: Europa Editions, 2005.
 Chourmo by Jean-Claude Izzo. New York: Europa Editions, 2006.
 The Lost Sailors by Jean-Claude Izzo. Translated from Marins perdus. New York: Europa Editions, 2007.
 Solea by Jean-Claude Izzo. New York: Europa Editions, 2007.
 The Vendetta by Honoré de Balzac. London: Hesperus, 2008.
 Mary of Nazareth: a Novel by Marek Halter. Translated from Marie. New York: Crown Publishers, 2008.
 A Sun for the Dying by Jean-Claude Izzo. Translated from Soleil des mourants. New York: Europa Editions, 2008.
 Zulu by Caryl Férey. New York: Europa Editions, 2010.
 Guys Like Me by Dominique Fabre. New York: New Vessel Press, 2015.
 The Snow was Dirty by Georges Simenon. London: Penguin Random House UK, 2016.
 Maigret and the Headless Corpse by Georges Simenon. London: Penguin Random House UK, 2017.

Translations from Italian
 A Walk in the Dark by Gianrico Carofiglio. Translated from Ad occhi chiusi. London: Bitter Lemon, 2006.
 A Private Affair by Beppe Fenoglio. Translated from Una questione privata. London: Hesperus, 2006.
 The Past is a Foreign Country by Gianrico Carofiglio. Translated from Il passato è una terra straniera. London: Old Street, 2007.
 The Turn by Luigi Pirandello. Translated from Il turno. London: Hesperus, 2007.
 The Death of a Mafia Don by Michele Giuttari. London: Abacus, 2009.
 Who is Lou Sciortino by Ottavio Cappellani. Translated from Chi è Lou Sciortino?. New York: Farrar, Straus and Giroux, 2010.
 A Death in Calabria by Michele Giuttari. London: Little, Brown, 2010.
 In the Sea There are Crocodiles: The Story of Enaiatollah Akbari by Fabio Geda. Oxford: David Fickling Books, 2011.

Translations from Spanish
 Tierra del Fuego by Francisco Coloane. New York: Europa Editions, 2008.
 The Shadow of What We Were by Luis Sepúlveda. Translated from Sombra de lo que fuimos. New York : Europa Editions, 2011.

References

External links
 Q&A with Howard Curtis
 Dan Wickett, Reading the World 2007: E-Panel of Literary Translators, 6 June 2007
 

1949 births
Living people
British translators
French–English translators
Italian–English translators
Literary translators
Winners of the Marsh Award for Children's Literature in Translation